The women's Nanquan / Nandao all-round competition at the 2018 Asian Games in Jakarta, Indonesia was held on 19 and 20 August at the JIExpo Kemayoran Hall B3.

Schedule
All times are Western Indonesia Time (UTC+07:00)

Results

References

External links
Official website

Women's nanquan